Jean V Charles, Count Snoy et d'Oppuers (2 July 1907 in Braine-l'Alleud – 17 May 1991) was a Belgian civil servant, diplomat and Christian Democratic politician of the PSC-CVP.

Family 

Jean-Charles was born son of Thierry Idesbald, Baron Snoy et d'Oppuers member of the Belgian Senate, mayor and Jacqueline de Pret Roose de Calesberg. He married Countess Nathalie d'Alcantara and they lived at the Snoy family estate, the Castle of Bois-Seigneur-Isaac.

Career 
He studied Law and Thomistic philosophy at the Catholic University of Leuven. He was Secretary-General of the Belgian Ministry of Economic Affairs and Head of the Belgian Delegation to the Intergovernmental Conference on the Common Market and Euratom at the Château of Val-Duchesse in 1956. He notably signed the Treaties of Rome for Belgium, together with Paul-Henri Spaak and Robert Rothschild in 1957. He was Minister of Finance from 1968 to 1971. From 1982 until 1984, he was President of the European League for Economic Cooperation. He was a member of the Steering Committee of the Bilderberg Group.

References

Bibliography
 Snoy et d'Oppuers, Jean-Charles, Rebâtir l'Europe, Mémoires, Paris, Duculot, 1989.

External links
 Jean Charles Snoy et d'Oppuers (Dutch)
 Jean-Charles Snoy et d'Oppuers in ODIS - Online Database for Intermediary Structures  
 Archives of Jean-Charles Snoy et d'Oppuers in ODIS - Online Database for Intermediary Structures 
 Castle of Bois-Seigneur-Isaac

1907 births
1991 deaths
People from Braine-l'Alleud
Counts of Belgium
Christian Social Party (Belgium, defunct) politicians
20th-century Belgian politicians
Finance ministers of Belgium
Government ministers of Belgium
Members of the Chamber of Representatives (Belgium)
Belgian diplomats
Belgian civil servants
Members of the Steering Committee of the Bilderberg Group
Belgian Roman Catholics
Grand Crosses with Star and Sash of the Order of Merit of the Federal Republic of Germany
20th-century Belgian civil servants